The Forum for Philosophy (previously, the Forum for European Philosophy, 1996–2018), founded in 1996, is a nonprofit philosophical organization whose purpose is to promote philosophy. The Forum is not aligned with any particular school of philosophical thought and its aim is to make philosophy accessible to the largest number of people. The organization hosts free weekly discussions in the London School of Economics, from which it produces regular podcasts. The Forum also publishes an essay series.

Activities
The Forum supports the following:

 Free, weekly discussions
 Podcasts
 Essays
 Thinking in Public grant
 Co-sponsor of the annual SEP-FEP conference

People

References

External links
Forum for Philosophy website
for Philosophy on YouTube
Forum for Philosophy on iTunes
Essays from the Forum for Philosophy

Organizations established in 1996
Educational organizations based in Europe
Philosophical societies